Stefan Michael Neuhaus (born November 15, 1973) is an American politician and the current County Executive of Orange County, New York. He previously served as the Town Supervisor of Chester, New York elected in 2007 until 2013.

Education
He was a Monroe-Woodbury graduate who took courses at SUNY Orange  simultaneously during his high school years, Neuhaus received a BA from Mount Saint Mary College in Newburgh, New York and a Masters in Public Administration from Marist College in Poughkeepsie, New York.

Early life

After receiving his master's degree and prior to his election as Chester Town Supervisor, Neuhaus worked in the City Manager’s Office in Newburgh, in the Village Manager’s Officer for the Village of Walden, and as the Vice President of Special Projects for Taylor Recycling in Montgomery. He was also a licensed insurance agent and broker.

Military service
After 9/11, Steve signed up to serve in the military, and enlisted in the Army Guard and later joined the United States Navy Reserve. Currently, Neuhaus is an Officer in the Navy Reserve and assigned to the Pacific Fleet. Neuhaus has been deployed internationally four times, to Africa, South Korea, Iraq and Europe in response to the conflict in Ukraine.  His South Korea and Iraq deployments occurred when he was Orange County Executive.  During the lengthy Iraq deployment, Neuhaus gave the “State of the County” address by livestream and continued daily operational control of County government by teleconferencing with staff, reporters, and others.

During his Iraqi deployment, Neuhaus served with the Combined Joint Special Operations Task Force in various locations throughout the country in Support of Operation Inherent Resolve, the U.S. Military Campaign against ISIS. In preparation for the assignment, Neuhaus was deployed to the Middle East in early-January after completing pre-mobilization training at Fort Bliss Army Base in El Paso, Texas in December. When he returned in late-June of 2019, Neuhaus stated that he planned on continuing his focus on economic development and tourism, as well as working to strengthen the County’s infrastructure.  During the COVID-19 crisis, Neuhaus gave nightly reports to thousands of Orange County residents on COVID related issues.

Neuhaus is a supporter of the Hudson Valley Honor Flight, where he was a guardian for the first flight to bring World War II veterans to Washington, D.C., to see the new memorial created in their honor. Neuhaus is a founding board member and former chairman of the Families of War Veterans Committee which supports veterans of Iraq and Afghanistan.

Chester government
In 2004, Neuhaus became a Chester, New York Councilman, a position that lasted until 2007. He then ran a successful bid for Chester Town Supervisor, an office he held from 2008 until his election to County Executive. During his tenure as Town Supervisor, Neuhaus pushed for economic development. Also during his time, he held the line on property taxes for Chester residents.

County Executive race
Neuhaus announced his candidacy for County Executive on November 17, 2012 along with Warwick, New York Town Supervisor Michael Sweeton in a Republican Party primary. Sweeton later withdrew from the race allowing Neuhaus to secure the Republican Party line. Neuhaus also had the support of both the Conservative and Independence Party lines.

His opponent in the election was Orange County Legislator Roxanne Donnery who held the Democrat and the temporary Had Enough party lines. Neuhaus won the election with 55% of the vote, focusing his campaign on economic development, the county's long shut down government center, the county-owned nursing home, and fixing the county's burgeoning budget crisis.

Neuhaus was re-elected in 2017, easily defeating Democrat Pat Davis. Neuhaus won approximately 59.6 percent of the vote to Davis' 40.4 percent. Neuhaus ran unopposed in 2021.

County Executive
When first elected in 2013, Neuhaus was the youngest County Executive in the county's history.

Family
The son of German immigrants, Neuhaus and his two sisters were raised on a working farm. His father is a dentist on New York State Route 17M in Chester, New York. Neuhaus and his wife Rachel live with their family in Chester.

References

American people of German descent
Marist College alumni
Mount Saint Mary College alumni
Town supervisors in New York (state)
Orange County Executives
New York (state) Republicans
People from Chester, Orange County, New York
1973 births
Living people